2010 Winter Olympics marketing has been a long running campaign that began since Vancouver won its bid to host the games in 2003.

Symbols

Emblem

The 2010 Winter Olympics logo was unveiled on April 23, 2005, and is named Ilanaaq the Inunnguaq. Ilanaaq is the Inuktitut word for friend. The logo was based on the Inukshuk (stone landmark or cairn) built by Alvin Kanak for the Northwest Territories Pavilion at Expo 86 and donated to the City of Vancouver after the event. It is now used as a landmark on English Bay Beach.

Slogan
The slogan for the 2010 Olympics was "With glowing hearts". The slogan is a reference to Canada's national anthem, O Canada.

Look of the Games
Leo Obstbaum (1969–2009), the late director of design for the 2010 Winter Olympics, oversaw and designed many of the main symbols of the Games, including the mascots, medals and the design of the Olympic torches.

Mascots

The mascots for the 2010 Winter Olympic and Paralympic Games were designed by Vicki Wong and Michael C. Murphy of Meomi Design and introduced on November 27, 2007. Inspired by traditional First Nations creatures, the mascots include:
 Miga — A mythical sea bear, part orca and part Kermode bear.
 Quatchi — A sasquatch, who wears winter boots and blue earmuffs.
 Sumi — An animal guardian spirit who wears the hat of an orca whale, flies with the wings of the mighty Thunderbird and runs on the strong furry legs of a black bear.
 Mukmuk — A Vancouver Island marmot.

Coins
The Royal Canadian Mint produced a series of commemorative coins celebrating the 2010 Games, and in partnership with CTV allowed users to vote on the Top 10 Canadian Olympic Winter Moments; where designs honouring the top three were added to the series of coins.

Multimedia

DVD set
An international release of a DVD set of the Olympics was released on 15 June 2010 in English and French.

Albums

Three albums, Canada's Hockey Anthems: Sounds of the Vancouver 2010 Winter Olympic Games, Sounds of Vancouver 2010: Opening Ceremony Commemorative Album, and Sounds of Vancouver 2010: Closing Ceremony Commemorative Album, composed, arranged and produced by Dave Pierce, were released to accompany the Games. Pierce's Music Direction for the Opening and Closing Ceremonies led him to win the Primetime Emmy Award for "Outstanding Music Direction" in 2010.

Songs

Theme song
The official song for the games was "I Believe". The song was sung by Nikki Yanofsky representing Anglophone Canada and Annie Villeneuve represented Francophone Canada.

Video games
Two official video games have been released to commemorate the Games: Mario & Sonic at the Olympic Winter Games was released for Wii and Nintendo DS in October 2009, while Vancouver 2010 was released in January 2010 for Xbox 360, Windows and PlayStation 3.

Stamps

Canada Post released many stamps to commemorate the Vancouver Games including, one for each of the mascots and one to celebrate the first Gold won in Canada. Many countries' postal services have also released stamps, such as the US, Germany, Australia (who present medallists with a copy of the stamps depicting their image), Austria, Belarus, Croatia, Czech Republic, Estonia, France, Italy, Liechtenstein, Lithuania, Poland, Switzerland, Turkey and Ukraine.

Corporate sponsorship and advertising

Sponsors
Worldwide Olympic Partners

National Partners

Official Supporters

Official Suppliers

National Media Suppliers

See also 

 2014 Winter Olympics marketing
 2018 Winter Olympics marketing

References

Further reading 
 
 

Marketing
Olympic marketing